Abraham Joseph ben Simon Wolf Menz was an eighteenth century rabbi and mathematician at Frankfurt.

He wrote an elementary textbook on mathematics entitled Reshit Limmudim, in three parts: Kelale handasah, the general rules of algebra; Yesodot ha-gematriot, the elements of geometry; and Yesod ha-tekunah, on astronomy. Only the first part was published (Berlin, 1775).

References

18th-century rabbis from the Ottoman Empire
18th-century German mathematicians
Jewish scientists
Rabbis from Frankfurt